Grechikhino is a rural locality (a selo) in Medveditskoye Rural Settlement, Zhirnovsky District, Volgograd Oblast, Russia. The population was 80 as of 2010. There are 3 streets.

Geography 
Grechikhino is located in steppe of Volga Upland, on the right bank of the Medveditsa River, 22 km north of Zhirnovsk (the district's administrative centre) by road. Bolshaya Knyazevka is the nearest rural locality.

References 

Rural localities in Zhirnovsky District